Yael Lotan (September 11, 1935 – November 2, 2009) was an Israeli writer, journalist, editor, translator, peace and human rights activist.

Biography
Lotan was born in Mandatory Palestine in 1935, the daughter of Dr. Binyamin Eliav  Lubotzky (1909, Riga – July 30, 1974, Petah Tikva), an Israeli journalist and diplomat, a member of the Revisionist Zionism movement and editor of the "HaMashkif" newspaper, who became a member of the social democratic Mapai party, just before the state was founded. She traveled with her parents to Argentina on a mission from the Ministry of Foreign Affairs in 1953. A year later she went to study in London and lived in Golders Green, where she married Maurice Stoppi, a Jewish-English engineer.

In 1958, she moved with her husband to Jamaica. In 1960 she published her first book, The Other Eye, a novel written in English, and published in London by Peter Davies publishing.

In 1965, she divorced Stoppi and moved to the United States, where she married Loyle Hairston, an African-American writer who was a trade union activist, and a leader of New York postal workers.

In 1970, she returned to Israel with her two children. Yael had a bachelor's degree in education and studied at the Bezalel Academy of Art and Design and Communication Studies in New York City. In the 1970s, she edited the quarterly for art, literature and science, "Ariel", which was the Ministry of Foreign Affairs' information quarterly. At the end of 1979, it was decided not to renew her employment contract. She went on to edit New Outlook, which was an Israeli political magazine in English, owned by "Al HaMishmar". In the 1980s, she edited the literary supplement of the newspaper Al Hamishmar and the literary pages of the weekly Ketrat Rashit.

In 1981, she published the story of the life of Amos Orion, an Israeli criminal who was convicted in the 1960s for murder, and the circumstances of his own murder were widely publicized. She began writing the book before his murder in July 1980.

On November 6, 1986, she met in Romania, as part of a delegation of about 20 people, with Palestine Liberation Organization members, and as a result was prosecuted, about a year later, along with Reuven Kaminer, Latif Dori and Eliezer Feiler, for violating the so-called "Meetings Law", which banned contact between Israelis and representatives of a "terrorist organization". The Ramla Magistrate's Court sentenced them to 18 months in prison, of which six months in practice. After hearing the sentence they stated that: "We did not expect such a punishment, this is a draconian verdict. We have never harmed state security. We have tried to promote peace and we're treated like criminals. We did not break the law, but held talks for the advancement of peace". Their appeal to the district court on the conviction and sentence was rejected, but on appeal to the Supreme Court, their sentence was reduced to a fine of NIS 1,000 each.

From 1989 to 1993 she lived in London, writing and translating in Hebrew and English. Since 1994, she was a regular contributor to the Palestine–Israel Journal.

Lotan was active in the "Campaign to Free Vanunu and for a Nuclear-free Middle East". and assisted Mordechai Vanunu after his release from prison. On May 22, 2004, she conducted an interview with Vanunu for the Sunday Times and the BBC, to legally circumvent Vanunu's restrictions on speaking to foreign journalists. 

However, a few days later, the Shin Bet arrested the British journalist Peter Hounam, a reporter for the Sunday Times, and detained at the Ben-Gurion Airport a reporter for the BBC, Chris Mitchell, who made the film about Vanunu and confiscated the recordings.

Lotan translated fiction and non-fiction from Hebrew into English, including the works of Shlomo Sand, Alona Kimchi, Sami Michael, Dorit Rabinyan, and Gershon Shaked. Her translations from English to Hebrew are the books of Patricia Cornwall and Aldous Huxley.

She died of liver cancer on November 2, 2009, aged 74, in Givatayim, Israel.

Published works

Books

 The Other Eye, London: Peter Davies publishing, 1960
 Phaedra, New York: Bantam, 1962
 Mangrove town, Garden City, N.Y.: Doubleday, 1964
 No Peace Yet, London: Halban, 1991
 Avishag, Toby Press, 2002

Selected articles
 Yael Lotan, No Peace Yet, Ariel: The Israel Review of Arts and Letters – Vol. 102, 1996
 Yael Lotan, The Vanunu Campaign and Its Lessons, Antiwar.com, April 29, 2004
 Lotan, Yael. "Israel at 50: Zionism's cultural 'revolution.'." Race and Class, vol. 40, no. 1, 1998, p. 71

References

External links
 Yael Lotan – In Memoriam website
 
 An excahnge of letter between Lotan and Assad el Assad, General Secretary for the Union of Palestinian Writers, New Internationalist, issue 199 – September 1989

1935 births
2009 deaths
Israeli people of Latvian-Jewish descent
Israeli women journalists
Translators to Hebrew
Hebrew–English translators
Deaths from cancer in Israel
Deaths from liver cancer
Burials at Yarkon Cemetery
20th-century translators
20th-century Israeli women writers
21st-century Israeli women writers